A nine-dart finish, also known as a nine-darter, is a perfect leg or single game in the sport of darts. The object of the game is to score  a set number of points, most commonly 501; in order to win, a player must reach the target total exactly and hit a double scoring area with their last dart. When the target is 501, the minimum number of darts needed to reach it is nine. For example, one way to achieve a nine-dart finish is to score 60 (triple 20) on each of the first seven throws, then a 57 (triple 19) on the eighth, and lastly a 24 (double 12) on the ninth. It is regarded as an extremely difficult feat to achieve even for the sport's top players, and is considered the highest single-game achievement in the sport, similar to a maximum 147 break in snooker or a 300-point game in bowling.

The feat was first achieved on television by John Lowe in 1984, and has since been via this medium a total 64 times. Paul Lim was the first to hit a nine-darter in the World Championship, making history during the 1990 BDO World Darts Championship in a second-round victory over Jack McKenna. Phil Taylor has achieved the most on television with 15, his first coming in 2002 and his last in 2015. Taylor is the only player to achieve two nine-darters in the same match, doing so in the final of the 2010 Premier League against James Wade. The following year, Brendan Dolan became the first to accomplish a nine-darter by starting and finishing with a double, as per the format of the World Grand Prix event of that year.

Adrian Lewis was the first player to hit a nine-darter in a World Championship final, doing so during the 2011 PDC World Darts Championship final against Gary Anderson. Twelve years later, Michael Smith repeated the feat in the 2023 PDC World Darts Championship final against Michael van Gerwen. In 2013, Terry Jenkins and Kyle Anderson were the first players to hit a nine-darter on the same day, doing so on the second day of the 2014 PDC World Darts Championship. Wade and Robert Thornton were the first players to both achieve a perfect leg in the same match, doing so during the 2014 World Grand Prix.

Methods of achievement

A single game of darts (known as a leg) requires a player to score exactly 501 points, ending with either the bullseye or a double. Each shot consists of exactly three darts, and 60 is the maximum that can be scored with any one dart. Thus 180 is the maximum score from a shot, and nine throws are the minimum necessary to win.

Although many other combinations are possible, the traditional nine-dart finish requires a score of 60 (triple 20) with each of the first six throws: that is, with the first two shots of three. That leaves 141 to score on the final shot (of three darts), known as the outshot.

This outshot of 141 is traditionally performed in one of three ways:

 triple 20 (60), triple 19 (57) and double 12 (24)
 triple 20 (60), triple 15 (45) and double 18 (36)
 triple 17 (51), triple 18 (54) and double 18 (36)

Another way is to score 167 with each set of three darts, scoring a perfect 501 total, in the following way:

 triple 20 (60), triple 19 (57) and bullseye (50)

By throwing each dart of a shot to a different place on the board, this eliminates the chance of any dart being deflected by an already thrown dart into the wrong scoring area but it is usually seen only in exhibition matches, as in tournaments, players are inclined to aim for the treble 20, only switching to the treble 19 for a cover shot.

Arguably the most difficult nine-dart finish would be 180 (3×T20), 171 (3×T19), and 150 (3×bullseye) – owing to the difficulty of getting all three darts in the bullseye: it is the smallest double on the board.

A nine-dart finish is also attainable in games which require a double to start scoring (a double-in; such games are thus termed double-in double-out with the existing double-out requirement). In such games, throwing for double 20 first can lead to a maximum score of 160 with the first shot, leaving the thrower commonly requiring 180 then 161 (T20, T17, bullseye) with their remaining six darts, though other outshots are possible. It is worth noting that in these games, only throwing for double 20, double 17, or bullseye to start the leg can result in a nine-dart finish, and if the bullseye is not the double-in, it must be the double-out (it can be both, although this would require a highly unorthodox finish using two bullseyes, such as T17-Bull-Bull for a 151).

The total number of different ways of achieving 501 with nine darts is 3,944, of which 2,296 finish with the bullseye, 672 end on D20, 792 on D18, 56 end on D17, 120 end on D15, and 8 end on D12. 574 of the possible ways can be used in a double-in double-out game. Currently, over 200 professional darts players have achieved nine-dart finishes, both televised and untelevised. Prior to 2006 there had been around 10.

Nine-dart finishes in televised matches

As of 3 January 2023, 72 nine-darters have been thrown in televised matches by 32 different players. 53 of those 72 hit two 180s and finished with a 141 check-out. English players have achieved a total of 35 nine-darters, 13 have been achieved by Dutch players, six by Scottish and Welsh players, three by Australian players, two by Belgian, Northern Irish and Portuguese players and one nine-darter has been achieved by players from the United States, Canada, and Lithuania. The first televised nine-dart finish was achieved at the MFI World Matchplay on 13 October 1984 by John Lowe, who checked out 141 with T17, T18, D18 after scoring two maximum 180s. For this he received a prize of £102,000, and he went on to win the whole event. This nine-dart finish was not broadcast live, nor was Paul Lim's at the 1990 BDO World Darts Championship. The first ever live broadcast nine-dart finish was performed by Shaun Greatbatch against Steve Coote in the final of the Dutch Open on 3 February 2002, while Phil Taylor achieved the first live nine-darter broadcast on British television during the 2002 World Matchplay.

Taylor has achieved the feat more than any other darts player on television, having done so 11 times. His first came on 1 August 2002 during a quarter-final tie against Chris Mason at the 2002 World Matchplay in Blackpool, for which Taylor received £100,000. Despite having achieved the feat a record 11 times, Taylor never hit a nine-darter in the World Championship, missing a chance on the outside wire of double 12 in his last match in the 2018 Final.

The youngest player to throw a televised nine-darter is Michael van Gerwen, who hit the perfect leg in the semi-finals of the 2007 Masters of Darts tournament in the Netherlands. The event was screened live in the Netherlands. Van Gerwen was just  old at the time, and was the first televised nine-darter that did not start with two 180s. Van Gerwen has since hit seven more televised nine-darters. 

The 2007 International Darts League became the first televised tournament to witness two nine-darters when Phil Taylor's nine-dart finish against Raymond van Barneveld was matched the following day by another one from Tony O'Shea against Adrian Lewis. In the second round of the 2008 Grand Slam of Darts in Wolverhampton, James Wade hit his first televised nine-dart-finish against Gary Anderson. The event was shown live on ITV4, making it the first time a nine-darter had been seen live on free-to-air television in the United Kingdom. Mervyn King hit his first televised nine-dart finish in the 2009 South African Masters in September 2009 against Wade, becoming the first player do so outside of Europe.

On 24 May 2010, in the Premier League final against Wade, Taylor made history by being the first player to ever hit two nine-dart finishes in a single match. These were his seventh and eighth nine-dart finishes. On 10 February 2017, Michael van Gerwen became the second player to hit two nine-dart finishes in a match, in a 2017 UK Open qualification event against Ryan Murray.

Brendan Dolan was the first player ever to hit a nine-darter in a double-in double-out game, doing so in the semi-final of the 2011 World Grand Prix against James Wade on 8 October. He opened with double 20, before hitting successive treble 20s (160, 180) and then finished on 161 with T20, T17 and a bullseye. He later changed his nickname to "The History Maker" to reflect his feat. In October 2014 at the World Grand Prix, Wade and his opponent Robert Thornton became the first players to both hit a nine-darter in the same match. Wade is the only player to have hit a 'standard' nine-darter and a double-in double-out nine-darter.

William Borland hit a nine-darter at the 2022 PDC World Darts Championship in his first-round matchup in the last leg of the match to become the first person to win a match on TV in the PDC by hitting a nine-darter. On 17 February 2022, Gerwyn Price achieved two nine-dart finishes on the same day, doing so in two separate matches during night 3 of the 2022 Premier League Darts during a win against Michael van Gerwen in the semi-final, and then against James Wade in the final. In total, Price achieved four nine-dart finishes in 2022; no player had previously managed more than two.

World Championship nine-darters
The first player to manage the outshot in the World Championship was Paul Lim on 9 January 1990 against Jack McKenna. Lim won a £52,000 bonus for the feat, more than the £24,000 Phil Taylor received for winning the event. In the 2018 PDC World Darts Championship, Lim missed double 12 in his second round match against Gary Anderson, which would have made him the first player to do a nine-dart finish in both versions of the World Darts Championship. Even with two versions of the World Championship in operation, Lim's achievement was not repeated for nearly 19 years until 2 January 2009, when Raymond van Barneveld became the second person to achieve the feat and the first since the split in darts. The finish came against Jelle Klaasen in the quarter-final of the 2009 World Championship at Alexandra Palace, and he claimed a £20,000 bonus prize. On 28 December 2009 he repeated the feat at the 2010 World Championship during his second round clash with Brendan Dolan.

Adrian Lewis achieved a nine-dart finish in the third leg of the 2011 World Championship final against Gary Anderson. On 23 December 2012 at the 2013 World Championship, Dean Winstanley hit a nine-dart finish in the third leg of the third set in his second round defeat to Vincent van der Voort. Another nine-dart finish at this Championship was achieved by Michael van Gerwen in his semi-final victory over James Wade in the third leg of the fifth set. The leg after the nine-darter (the fourth leg of the fifth set) van Gerwen hit another eight perfect darts but missed the last dart at the double to achieve consecutive nine-dart finishes.

On 14 December 2013 at the 2014 World Championship, Terry Jenkins and Kyle Anderson both hit nine-darters in their first round losses against Per Laursen and Ian White respectively. On 30 December 2014 in the third round of the 2015 World Championship, Adrian Lewis hit his second World Championship nine-dart finish and his third overall, though he lost the match 3–4 to Van Barneveld. On 2 January 2016 in the semi-finals of the 2016 World Championship, Gary Anderson hit a nine-dart finish to defeat Klaasen 6–0 to reach his third World Championship final.

On 17 December 2021, during the first round of the 2022 World Championship, William Borland hit a nine-dart finish to defeat Bradley Brooks 3–2 in a last leg decider to reach the second round, becoming the first player in PDC history to win a televised match with a nine-dart finish. He described it as "the best night of my life". The following day, Darius Labanauskas achieved the feat during a 3–1 loss to Mike De Decker. In the quarter-final, defending champion Gerwyn Price hit the third of the tournament in a loss to Michael Smith.

On 3 January 2023, in the 2023 PDC World Darts Championship Final, Michael Smith and van Gerwen both had three darts left to achieve a nine-dart finish in the same leg. After van Gerwen missed on the final dart, Smith checked out 141 and became only the second player to do so in the final of the event, and the first to hit one in the same leg that his opponent had missed one.

List of televised nine-dart finishes

Statistics

Multiple nine-darters in televised matches
The following table lists the number of perfect legs recorded by players who have scored multiple nine-darter in a televised match.

As of 3 January 2023

Nine-darter in televised matches by tournament

Nine-dart-finish prize money
In 1984, John Lowe pocketed £102,000 for the first TV perfect leg. With nine-dart finishes now thrown on a regular basis the reward for throwing one has decreased. Until 2013 the PDC had a rolling £400 prize-pool for a nine-dart leg. As long as it wasn't won, it increased by £400 for the next event. In 2013 the bonus stopped being awarded. For all PDC Premier events, the PDC formerly had a rolling £5000 prize-pool for a nine-dart leg. As long as it isn't won, the prize for hitting a nine-dart leg is increased by £5000. If multiple players hit a nine-dart finish in one premier event, the money is split evenly across all players who achieved a nine-dart finish in that event. So the prize for a nine-darter varies for every PDC premier event. In the 2015 tournament,  achieving the perfect leg in the PDC World Championships would win £10,000, (in the 2014 tournament the prize was £30,000). The reward for a nine-darter during the most recent BDO World Darts Championship was £52,000.

In 2019, a special prize of £100,000 was available to any player who hits two nine-dart finishes at the PDC World Championships, a feat which has never previously been achieved at any World Championship. As such, it didn't happen, and by the end of 2019, all prize money for nine-dart finishes were withdrawn, owing to the ever increasing prize fund for tournaments.

Women's nine-darters 
Though no female darts player has recorded a televised nine-dart finish to date, Mandy Solomons was the first woman to ever record a nine-dart finish in competition. It came in a match against Robert Hughes during the qualifying rounds for the 1996 BDO World Championship on 30 November 1995 at Earls Court, London. It was the first time female players were allowed to enter the qualifying rounds for the BDO World Championship. Hughes did end up winning the match 2–0 though. Solomons was also one of the first women to record a nine-dart finish in a regional Super League match.

Claire Stainsby and Glen Durrant made history when they recorded the first ever nine-dart finish in mixed pairs competition at the 2013 BDO International Open in Brean, Somerset. Durrant opened up with a 177, Stainsby followed that up with a 180 to leave Durrant on 144, which he ended up taking out for the first nine-dart finish in mixed pairs competition. As a result, Claire Stainsby was inducted into the BDO 9 Dart Club, thus becoming the first and so far only female to be inducted.

Ten-time World Champion Trina Gulliver revealed she has twice missed her last dart to record a nine-dart finish. One was a double 18 for $100,000 at an event in Canada and another missed double was for a car at an event in Ireland.

15-year-old Beau Greaves hit a nine-darter in a competition at Balby Bridge on 17 April 2019.

See also
 Change-making problem – making particular numbers with given denominations
 Maximum break in snooker
 Perfect game in bowling
 Perfect game in baseball
 Golden set in tennis
 Eight-ender in curling.

Notes

References

Darts terminology
Perfect scores in sports
Lists of darts players